The Diocese of Domokos (Latin dioecesis Domocensis or Dimicensis) or Thaumaci (Thaumacensis) was an ancient bishopric centred on the town of Domokos. It has been a suffragan of the See of Larissa since 732, when it ceased to be under the jurisdiction of the Patriarch of the West (the Pope). In 1882, when Domokos became part of the Kingdom of Greece, the diocese became subject to the autocephalous Church of Greece. It was suppressed in 1899.

Latin diocese 
In 1204, when Domokos fell to the Fourth Crusade, the authority of the Pope was reestablished and a series of Latin bishops held the diocese. The impoverished diocese was incapable of supporting more than three clergy in 1210, and in July 1208 it had been administratively united to the diocese of Kalydon by Pope Innocent III. Its incumbent at that time was a Burgundian, Gales of Dampierre, the second Latin bishop. After Domokos was reconquered by the Byzantine Empire, it became a titular see for the Latins. Three medieval titulars are known: Marcus Morellus, from about 1334; John, who died in 1366; and his successor, another John, a Franciscan friar. The Latin diocese of Domokos has been vacant since 21 November 1943.

List of titular Catholic bishops

Notes

Sources

 

Catholic titular sees in Europe
Thessaly
Domokos